Finnigan is a surname, a variant of Finnegan. Notable people with the surname include:

 Annette Finnigan (1873–1940), American suffragette and philanthropist
 Brian Finnigan, founder of the house of Finnigans
 Charles Finnigan, surgeon, rear-admiral and dental surgeon in the United Kingdom's Royal Navy
 Eddie Finnigan, ice hockey player
 Frank Finnigan, ice hockey player
 Jennifer Finnigan, Canadian actress
 Mike Finnigan (1945–2021), American rock keyboardist and singer
 Robert E. Finnigan, American scientist

Fictional characters
 Seamus Finnigan, a character in the Harry Potter series

See also
 Finnigan Sinister, one half of the 2000 AD hitman duo Sinister Dexter
 Finnigan Fox, an upcoming video game for the Intellivision Amico
 Finnegan (disambiguation)